Ingo Klemen (born 29 July 1986) is an Austrian professional footballer who currently plays as an attacker for SV Mattersburg in the Austrian Football First League.

References

1986 births
Place of birth missing (living people)
Living people
Austrian footballers
Association football forwards
SV Mattersburg players